Agnia lucipor is a species of beetle in the family Cerambycidae. It was described by Stephan von Breuning in 1982. It is known from  the Philippines.

References

Lamiini
Beetles described in 1982